Timothy Ting or Ting Ting-yu (born 1954) is a Taiwanese politician and sociologist.

Personal life
Ting graduated from National Taiwan University (NTU) with a bachelor's degree in sociology before going on to the University of Michigan for his doctorate. He has a son and a daughter, whom he sent to Lincoln, Nebraska for their education in the 1990s.

In academia and business
Ting served as an assistant professor of sociology at Kansas State University before returning to Taiwan, where he successively took up associate professorships at National Chengchi University and his alma mater NTU. In 1997 he left his post at NTU to work in the opinion polling industry. He eventually began working for Gallup Taiwan, a research organisation. In a 2006 letter to the Taipei Times, a spokesperson for the U.S.-based Gallup denied any association with Ting or his company.

As deputy mayor of Taipei
Ting was appointed third deputy mayor of Taipei by Hau Lung-pin in August 2011. His financial declaration at the time he took office showed that he owned investment properties in a number of cities. These included four in Shanghai and Beijing, making him the public official with the largest number of properties in mainland China. During his time in office, one issue to which he turned his focus was urban renewal; he stated that Taipei was at a disadvantage compared to other major cities in Asia such as Hong Kong, Beijing, and Shanghai due to its age, having been mostly constructed in the 1960s and 1970s.
 In October 2013, he visited Wuhan, Hubei as part of an official delegation during Hubei province's "Taiwan Week" in an effort to encourage companies there to invest in Taiwan.

References

1954 births
Living people
Pollsters
National Taiwan University alumni
University of Michigan alumni
Academic staff of the National Chengchi University
Academic staff of the National Taiwan University
Mayors of Taipei
Taiwanese sociologists
Kansas State University faculty